Heleșteni is a commune in Iași County, Western Moldavia, Romania. It is composed of four villages: Hărmăneasa, Heleșteni, Movileni and Oboroceni.

References

Communes in Iași County
Localities in Western Moldavia